Jemina Augusto Alves (born 1 October 1964) is a Brazilian former judoka. Alves competed in the women's lightweight event at the 1992 Summer Olympics.

References

External links
 

1964 births
Living people
Brazilian female judoka
Olympic judoka of Brazil
Judoka at the 1992 Summer Olympics
Sportspeople from Recife